Pritam Singh may refer to:

 Pritam Singh (Singaporean politician) (born 1976), Singaporean politician
 Pritam Singh (soldier) (military service 1942-51), Indian military officer
 Pritam Singh (gymnast) (born 1924), Indian Olympic gymnast
 Pritam Singh (footballer) (born 1993), Indian association football player
 Pritam Singh (Uttarakhand politician) (born 1958), Indian politician

 Pritam Singh (educationist) (1941–2020), Indian academic, educationist, and management professor
 Pritam Kumar Singh (born 1995), Indian footballer
 Pritam Singh Panwar, an Indian politician representing Dhanaulti Assembly constituency, Uttarakhand
 Giani Pritam Singh Dhillon, an Indian freedom fighter and Sikh missionary
 Pritam Singh Safir, (1916–1999) an Indian poet